KP4, Kp4 or kp4 may refer to

 Killer toxin Kp4 family, a family of killer toxins, which includes the Kp4 killer toxin from the smut fungus Ustilago maydis
 KP4, an amateur radio call sign assigned to operators in Puerto Rico, see Amateur radio licensing in the United States#Call signs

See also
 KP (disambiguation)